West Fulton Township is one of eighteen townships in Callaway County, Missouri, USA.  As of the 2010 census, its population was 7,269.

History
West Fulton Township was formed from a western section of historic Fulton Township in the 2000s.  The remainder of Fulton Township was later renamed East Fulton Township.  For a history of the unified Fulton Township, see East Fulton Township.

Geography
It contains two cemeteries: Callaway Memorial Gardens and Wright.

Transportation
West Fulton Township contains one airport or landing strip, Fulton Municipal Airport.

References

 USGS Geographic Names Information System (GNIS)

External links
 US-Counties.com
 City-Data.com

Townships in Callaway County, Missouri
Jefferson City metropolitan area
Townships in Missouri